is a 1990 Japanese film directed by Kōji Wakamatsu.

Cast
 Yoshio Harada
 Kaori Momoi
 Shirley Lu
 Keizō Kanie 
 Renji Ishibashi

Reception
It was chosen as the 2nd Best Film at the 12th Yokohama Film Festival. Keizō Kanie also won the Award for Best Actor. Renji Ishibashi won the Award for Best Supporting Actor at the 14th Japan Academy Prize and Yoshio Harada was nominated for Best Actor.

References

External links
 

Films directed by Kōji Wakamatsu
1990s Japanese films